Rise Of The Zombie is a 2013 Hindi Horror film directed by Luke Kenny and Devaki Singh. The film stars Luke Kenny, Kirti Kulhari and Ashwin Mushran.

Plot 
Neil Parker is a passionate wildlife photographer who pays more attention to his wildlife than his human life. As a result, his relationships with the real world suffer. When his girlfriend walks out on him he resigns himself to isolation and nature. But a chance occurrence changes all that. Changes that he can't seem to handle, changes that seem to take his humanity away... changes that seem unable to change back? The story follows his journey into a darkness that has to be seen to be believed. A monster that seems to be rising out of the depths of desolation and agony... soulless, depraved and out of control.

Cast
Luke Kenny
Kirti Kulhari
Ashwin Mushran
Benjamin Gilani

Critical reception
Rise of the Zombie had a limited release. Swati Deogire of in.com praised Luke Kenny's performance.  Rohit Vats of IBNLive gave the film two out of five, saying that it "could have become a better film if the makers would have devised a way of showing a connection between the gloomy environment of the mountains and the mystical origin of the zombie."

References

External links
 

2013 films
2010s Hindi-language films
Indian horror films
2013 horror films
Hindi-language horror films
Films scored by Biddu
Indian zombie films